The 2022 TC America Series Powered by Skip Barber Racing School is the fourth season of the TC America Series. The season began on April 15 at Sonoma Raceway and is scheduled to end on October 9 at Indianapolis Motor Speedway.

Calendar
The preliminary calendar was released on September 4, 2021, without disclosing the location of round 2. On October 10, 2021, the SRO announced that Ozarks International Raceway would fill the vacancy in the schedule, pending FIA circuit homologation. The round at Virginia International Raceway was also postponed one week to avoid a clash with the 2022 24 Hours of Le Mans. On April 27, 2022, the SRO announced that Ozarks round was replaced with NOLA Motorsports Park on the same date due to the challenges related with infrastructure and supply chain.

Entry list